Alessandro Occhiobello (born in Naples, Italy) is an Italian pornographic film director and actor who is also known under the names "Max Bellochio", "Max Bollecchio" and "Toni Montana". He has directed over 200 films since 1993.

Awards and nominations
 2008 AVN Award winner – Best Director, Foreign Release (Dangerous Sex)
 2009 Hot d'Or Award winner – Best European Director, Best European Screenplay, and Best European Movie (all for the movie Billionaire - Private)

References

External links
 
 
 Director Alessandro Del Mar at the Adult Film Databse
Interview in italian

Italian pornographic film directors
Film people from Naples
Living people
Year of birth missing (living people)